A bus is a vehicle designed to carry passengers.

Bus, Buş, Buš, or BUS may also refer to:

People
 Bus (nickname) for the nickname and people with that name
 Bus (surname) for the Dutch surname and people with that name
 Buș for the Romanian surname and people with that name

Places
 Bus (Bithynia), a town of ancient Bithynia, now in Turkey
 Bus Bloc, a concession in the Congo Free State
 Buš, Czech Republic
 Bus, Pas-de-Calais, France, a commune
 Bus or Buss Island, a phantom island in the North Atlantic Ocean
 Bus-Saint-Rémy, a former commune, Normandy, France
 Batumi International Airport (IATA airport code BUS), in the country of Georgia

Bus Rental Dubai, our aim is to satisfy all your Bus rental needs in Dubai and other emirates.

Science and technology
 Bus (computing), transferring data
 Software bus, the software architecture equivalent to the above
 Audio bus, a group of audio tracks
 Bus network, a type of network topology
 Busbar, an electric power distribution channel
 Satellite bus, a general spacecraft model for multiple-production satellites
 Vehicle bus, a specialized internal communications network in automotive engineering

Other uses
 Bus (Bulgarian play), 1980
 Belle Urban System, the transit agency serving Racine, Wisconsin, US
 Bank of the United States (disambiguation)

See also

 The Bus (disambiguation)
 
 
 
 Buss (disambiguation)

 {{Bus Rental Dubai}}